The Polikarpov VIT-2 (Vozdooshny Istrebitel' Tahnkov—Flying Tank Destroyer) was a Soviet twin-engined ground attack aircraft developed before World War II. A single prototype was built in 1938 for evaluation purposes. Although a promising design it was recommended that it be introduced into production as a high-speed dive bomber with a reduced armament to increase its speed.

Development
The VIT-2 was derived from the VIT-1 prototype, but it was given  Klimov M-105 engines and its structure was revised. It was a low-winged, twin-engined aircraft with a mixed structure. The monocoque fuselage was made in halves of 'shpon', molded birch plywood and a large fuel tank was placed between the pilot and rear gunner. The fuel tank was moved to the rear and the canopy was lengthened in consequence. The wing structure was built from a mix of steel tubes and duralumin with a duralumin skin. The empennage was redesigned as a twin tail. The main legs of the conventional landing gear retracted aft into the engine nacelles and were given fairing to reduce drag when retracted, but the tail-wheel was fixed. The nose was extensively glazed to give the bombardier/navigator good visibility and he was armed with a  ShVAK cannon with 10° of vertical travel. The rear gunner/radio operator sat in a manually operated turret armed with another ShVAK and he was also provided with a retractable pair of  ShKAS machine guns for ventral defense. Two  Shpitalnyi Sh-37 cannon and two more ShVAKs were mounted in the wing roots.

The prototype was first flown on 11 May 1938 by the famous pilot Valery Chkalov and had its propellers replaced by constant speed VISh-61 propellers shortly afterwards. It was recommended for production as a high-speed dive bomber provided that some of the armament was removed to increase its speed.

Specifications

References

Notes

Bibliography

 Gordon, Yefim. Soviet Airpower in World War 2. Hinckley, England: Midland Publishing, 2008 
 Gunston, Bill. The Osprey Encyclopaedia of Russian Aircraft 1875–1995. London, Osprey, 1995

External links

 http://www.ctrl-c.liu.se/misc/RAM/vit-2.html 

VIT-2
1930s Soviet attack aircraft
Abandoned military aircraft projects of the Soviet Union